Welcome Aboard Toxic Airlines is a 2007 British documentary film about aerotoxic syndrome directed and produced by former airline captain Tristan Loraine.

Synopsis
This documentary shows that for nearly fifty years, airline passengers and crews have been supplied with unfiltered air, called bleed air, taken directly from the engines. It shows how pressure groups have shown that this air supply sometimes becomes contaminated with neurotoxins, carcinogens and other hazardous chemicals. In aviation industry-speak this contamination is called a "fume event". Many have been reported some filling the passenger cabin with smoke and fumes.

Global Cabin Air Quality Executive 
Former British Airways Captain Tristan Loraine, who produced the film, is co-chair of Global Cabin Air Quality Executive (GCAQE).

Contrary opinions
Research by the UK government did not find a link to long-term health problems. The UK Parliament Select Committee on Science and Technology concluded in 2000 that the concerns about significant health risks were not substantiated.

In 2008 Michael Bagshaw, the former Head Doctor at British Airways, and later an advisor to Airbus, claimed that no peer-reviewed, recorded cases of neurological harm in humans followed low-level exposure to the organophosphate tricresyl phosphate (TCP), which is used as a lubricant in jet engines.

See also
 Aerotoxic Association

References

External links
 Official website

2007 films
British aviation films
British documentary films
2007 documentary films
2007 in aviation
2007 in the United Kingdom
Documentary films about environmental issues
Documentary films about aviation
2000s English-language films
2000s British films